This is a list of United States ambassadors to the Association of Southeast Asian Nations. The formal title of this position is "Representative of the United States to the Association of Southeast Asian Nations, with the rank and status of Ambassador Extraordinary and Plenipotentiary".

 Scot Marciel (2008 – 2011)
 David L. Carden (2011 – 2013)
 Nina Hachigian (2014 – 2017)
 Jane E. Bocklage (January – May 2017, as Charge d'affaires)
 Daniel L. Shields (May – December 2017, as Charge d'affaires)
 Jane E. Bocklage (December 2017 – June 2018, as Charge d'affaires)
 Piper Anne Wind Campbell (June - December 2018, as Chargé d’affaires).
 Jane E. Bocklage (December 2018 – June 2019).
 James A. Caruso (June – August 2019) 
 Melissa A. Brown (August 2019 – March 31, 2022, as Charge d'affaires)
 Kate Rebholz (March 31, 2022 – October 5, 2022, as Charge d'affaires)
 Yohannes Abraham (October 5, 2022 – present)

References

External links
 

ASEAN
 
United States–Asian relations